The Directorate of Naval Intelligence is the intelligence arm of the Indian Navy.

References

Defence agencies of India
Indian Navy
Naval intelligence
Indian intelligence agencies
Government agencies with year of establishment missing